Giorgos Skrekis (born 2 February 1945) is a Greek former professional footballer who played as a defender. His nickname was "Kalpos", due his running style at the pitch resembled that of a horse's gallop.

Club career
Skrekis was from a young age systematically involved in football as a member of the infrastructure teams of Iraklis Kallitheas. In 1962, at the age of 17, he was transferred to Panionios and the following year, the coach of the blue and red team, Giannis Skordilis, established him in the first team, giving him the position of central defender, in which he played successfully for almost five years. He was a key player for his team in reaching the final of the Greek Cup in 1967, where they lost by Panathinaikos. In 1968, the coach of red and blues, Dezső Bundzsák, recognizing his special speed and his fast acceleraion, relocated him as a right full-back. His career at the club of Nea Smyrni culminated in 1971 with the second place in the Championship, behind AEK Athens and the conquest of the Balkans Cup. A serious injury at the beginning of the following season left him out of the squad for a long period.

In the summer of 1974, Skrekis was transferred to AEK Athens of Loukas Barlos and František Fadrhonc, alongside his teammates, Georgios Dedes and Victor Theofylopoulos. Even though Fadrhonc believed in his abilities, his relatively advanced footballing age and the remains of his serious injury did not allow him to impress with the yellow-black jersey. He scored his only goal on 21 December 1975 in a 2–1 home win over Aris. He was a part of the squad that reached to the semi-finals of the UEFA Cup in the 1977. In 1977, he returned to Panionios for a season, where he ended his career. In fact, in 1978 he was awarded the Golden Cross of Panionios, the club's greatest award, for his overall contribution.

International career

Skrekis was five times international with Greece between 1966 and 1970. He made his debut on 16 October 1966 in a 2–1 home win for the Euro qualifiers against Finland. He played again on 11 October 1970 in an away match against Malta for the Euro qualifiers, which ended 1–1. This was followed by two friendly defeats against Spain away from home and Australia at home. His last appearance was on 16 December 1970 in a home match for the Euro qualifiers against Switzerland, which were defeated by 1–0.

Skrekis also played 5 times for the Greece Military Team with which he won the World Military Cup for two consecutive years in 1968 and 1969.

After football
After finishing his football career, Skrekis was very successful in the travel business and is the owner of the GS TRAVEL S.A. travel agency, organizing through it many fan trips for matches of Greek teams abroad. His friendship with Dimitrios Melissanidis, made him accept in joining him in the summer of 2013 in his Steering Committee of AEK, even though his tenure was brief.

Personal life
Skrekis is married and has two daughters.

Honours

Panionios
Balkans Cup: 1971

Greece Military
World Military Cup: 1968, 1969

Individual
 Panionios Golden Cross: 1978

References

1945 births
Living people
Greece international footballers
Panionios F.C. players
AEK Athens F.C. players
Association football defenders
Footballers from Athens
Greek footballers
Super League Greece players